Thomas A. Rodgers served as the second Secretary of State of Alabama from 1819 until his death on September 28, 1821.

In addition to serving as Secretary of State, he  was a member of the 1819 Alabama Constitutional Convention.

References

Secretaries of State of Alabama
1821 deaths
Date of birth missing